The Highway Police is a specialized unit of the Bangladesh Police that is responsible for law enforcement on Bangladesh roads. The unit is led by an Additional inspector general of Bangladesh Police.

History
The Highway Police was established on 11 June 2005 by the Bangladesh Nationalist Party government. It can only investigate crimes under a few sections of Penal Code 1860 and the Motor Vehicle Ordinance, 1983. The Highway Police has jurisdiction over 5,487 kilometre of national highways and 4,165 kilometre of local roads.

On 28 August 2018, the Highway Police suspended the Officer in Charge of Bonpara Highway Police Station GM Shamsun Nur.  This was  after a bus without proper registration papers was involved in a fatal road accident in which 15 people died.

List of Chiefs of Highway Police

References

2005 establishments in Bangladesh
Bangladesh Police
Law enforcement agencies of Bangladesh